Groovin' with Manfred Mann is an EP by Manfred Mann, released in 1964. The EP is a 7-inch vinyl record and released in mono with the catalogue number His Master's Voice-EMI 7EG 8876.

Personnel
 Manfred Mann - keyboards
 Mike Vickers - guitar, alto saxophone, flute
 Tom McGuinness - bass guitar
 Mike Hugg - drums and vibes
 Paul Jones - lead vocals, harmonica

Track listing
Side 1
 "Groovin'" (Ben E. King, James Bethea)
 "Do Wah Diddy Diddy" (Jeff Barry, Ellie Greenwich)

Side 2
 "Can't Believe It" (Paul Jones)
 "Did You Have To Do That" (Paul Jones)

Recording dates 

 "Groovin" – 23 June
 "Do Wah Diddy Diddy" – 11 & 22 June
 "Can't Believe It" – 23 June 
 "Did You Have To Do That" – 28 July

References

1964 EPs
EMI Records EPs
Manfred Mann EPs
His Master's Voice EPs